Tyler Jet Motorsports was a NASCAR Winston Cup Series team.

History
Tyler Jet Motorsports was owned by Tim Beverley, owner of the airplane sales company that shared a name with the race team, and was formed in 1998 when Beverley bought Darrell Waltrip's race team after Waltrip could not find sponsorship to continue running as an owner-driver. Beverly later bought the NASCAR operation of ISM Racing after owner Bob Hancher backed out of the Cup Series at the midway point of the season, having failed to qualify for the majority of events they had entered with the #35 Tabasco Pontiac. Beverley combined the two operations into one, fielding the former ISM car with Waltrip, who had spent the interim period as a long term substitute at Dale Earnhardt, Inc., starting to drive the #35 at Indianapolis. However, Beverley had inherited problems that began when Hancher, against the wishes of Tabasco maker McIlhenny Company, had fired Todd Bodine earlier in the season. McIlhenny became even more furious when Beverley switched manufacturers from Pontiac to Chevrolet immediately after signing Waltrip to drive the #35, and a court battle ensued that forced Beverley to resume running Pontiacs beginning with the Pepsi 400 at Michigan. The team's best finish was in its first race, with Waltrip finishing thirteenth in a Chevrolet. The #35 only ran in the top 20 once more before the season ended, and after the season McIlhenny, who had been using the race team more as a marketing tool than anything else, pulled its sponsorship from the #35 and left NASCAR altogether; this ended what has been referred to as the "Tabasco Fiasco" in NASCAR circles in the years since. Waltrip left the team as well following the 1998 season, joining Haas-Carter Motorsports for what would be the last two years of his career.

In 1999, the team fielded Pontiacs and switched to the No. 45, with sponsorship from the 10-10-345 long distance telephone service. Rich Bickle, (who incidentally, had driven for Darrell Waltrip in the Craftsman Truck Series) was hired as the driver, but was released late in the season, and was replaced by David Green. Green recorded the best finish of his Cup series career, a 12th at Phoenix, and won thee  only pole in his (and the team's) Cup career, the following weekend at the inaugural Cup series race at Homestead-Miami Speedway. During the team's first two seasons of operations, four drivers and three crew chiefs were hired.

For the 2000 season, Tyler Jet switched to the No. 10 and hired Johnny Benson to pilot the car on November 22, 1999. Their first exposure came at the Daytona 500, where Benson's unsponsored Pontiac took the lead late in the race and held the lead for 39 laps, only to be passed by cars that had made full pit stops under a late race caution (Benson was playing strategy, having only stopped for two tires and fuel his last stop) and finish 12th.

Lycos signed on as sponsor for the No. 10 and stayed with them until the 2000 Pepsi 400, where Tyler Jet pulled them off the car due to nonpayment; Lycos would eventually sue Tyler Jet on July 16, 2001. They would run unsponsored for the next four races, but Beverley was forced to sell the team afterwards. The car, which had just acquired sponsorship from Aaron's, was sold to MB2 Motorsports on July 20. The team would continue to be based in Tyler Jet's shop located near Lowe's Motor Speedway, and ran until the end of the 2005 season when the car number, sponsor (Valvoline) and driver (Scott Riggs) moved to Evernham Motorsports. The successor team and car were Ginn Racing's No. 14, which was sold to Dale Earnhardt, Inc. and merged into its No. 15 team, which in turn was folded after the merger that created Earnhardt Ganassi Racing; the resulting team, by 2014 was simply known as Chip Ganassi Racing, was in turn purchased by Trackhouse Racing Team in 2021.

References

Auto racing teams established in 1998
Auto racing teams disestablished in 2000
Defunct NASCAR teams
American auto racing teams